Danijel Riđić (born 9 December 1962) is a former Bosnian national team handball player and current coach.

He is currently coach of RK Vogošća Poljine HillsRK Vogošća Poljine Hills.

From 2009 to 2011 he was assistant coach to Irfan Smajlagić in RK Bosna Sarajevo.

During his playing days he was a big influence to Mateo Hrvatin.

Honours
RK Zamet Rijeka
Croatian First B League (1): 1995-96

References

External links
European profile

1975 births
Living people
RK Zamet players
Croatian male handball players
Handball players from Rijeka
Croatian handball coaches